Peter Witheridge Grafton CBE (19 May 1916 – 20 May 2012), was a British Liberal Party politician and surveyor.

Background
He was born one of twin brothers, sons of James Hawkins Grafton and Ethel Marion Brannan. He was educated at Westminster City School, Sutton Valence School and the College of Estate Management. In 1939 he married Joan Bleackley who died in 1969. They had two daughters (and one son and one daughter, deceased). In 1971 he married Margaret Ruth Ward. They had two sons.

Early career
He served as a captain in the war of 1939–45 in the Queen's Westminster Rifles, the Dorsetshire Regiment and the Royal Engineers in the UK and the Far East. He served in India, Ceylon, and Java and went with the expeditionary force to the Cocos Islands.

Political career
He was Liberal candidate for the Bromley division of Kent at the 1950 General Election. He broke his leg three days before the election was called and conducted his campaign on crutches. 

He did not stand for parliament again. In 1953, together with Desmond Banks who had been Liberal parliamentary candidate in Harrow East in 1950, Grafton co-founded the Radical Reform Group, a social liberal pressure group within the Liberal Party to prevent what many saw as a rightward drift by the party, and its potential capture by the economic liberals. The Group campaigned under the slogan 'social reform without socialism'. Grafton was the group's Honorary Secretary.

Professional career
He was a senior partner, at G. D. Walford & Partners, Chartered Quantity Surveyors, 1978–82 having been a Partner 1949–78.

In 1972 he was appointed a CBE.

References

1916 births
2012 deaths
Liberal Party (UK) parliamentary candidates
Commanders of the Order of the British Empire
British Army personnel of World War II
Queen's Westminsters officers
Dorset Regiment officers
Royal Engineers officers